Te Paepae o Aotea (Volkner Rocks) Marine Reserve is a marine reserve covering an area of  in the Bay of Plenty of New Zealand's North Island.

The reserve was established in 2006 and is administered by the Department of Conservation.

History

According to oral history, Te Paepae o Aotea was used as a landmark to show land was close.

The rocks became culturally significant to Ngāti Awa and other iwi descending from the Mātaatua waka, as the departure place for the spirits of all their people. Spirits linger here, leaving the physical world and reuniting with the souls of the departed.

The marine reserve was established on 9 October 2006.

Flora and fauna

The rock pinnacles rise from 400 metres below the sea floor, creating a wide range of habitats. The reserve is affected by oceanic, deepwater influences.

The clear water and warm east Auckland current from subtropical regions north of New Zealand supports a range of diversity, including the rare firebrick starfish, diadema urchin, Spanish lobster and packhorse crayfish.

Recreation

The marine reserve is only accessible by boat. There are several boat ramps, boating facilities and charter boat services, including regular diving and sightseeing excursions. The primary access is by charter boat, including diving and sightseeing excursions.

The Department of Conservation advises only visiting the marine reserve in calm sea conditions, including boats longer than seven metres, due to its distance offshore and exposed location.

Te Paepae o Aotea (Volkner Rocks) Marine Reserve is popular for snorkelling and diving. Underwater visibility is generally good due low levels of sedimentation and run-off, but is poor during seasonal phytoplankton blooms.

The rocks were formally used as a bombing range for the New Zealand Air Force and some ordinances may remain in place.

A range of activities are banned in the marine reserve, including fishing, taking or killing marine life, and moving or removing any marine life or materials. People must not feed fish as it disturbs their natural behaviour, and they must take care when anchoring to avoid damaging the sea floor.

See also

 Marine reserves of New Zealand
 List of islands of New Zealand
 Desert island
 Marine reserves of New Zealand

References

External links
Te Paepae o Aotea Marine Reserve at the Department of Conservation
Press release about reserve, Minister of Conservation

Marine reserves of New Zealand
Protected areas of the Bay of Plenty Region
Whakatane District
2006 establishments in New Zealand
Protected areas established in 2006